Events in the year 1936 in Japan.  It corresponds to Shōwa 11 (昭和11年) in the Japanese calendar.

Incumbents
Emperor: Hirohito
Prime Minister:
Keisuke Okada, until March 9
Kōki Hirota, from March 9

Events

February 5 – Japanese Baseball League is founded.
February 6 – Ricoh founded.
February 21 – According to USGS official report, a Richer scale 6.0 earthquake hit on Mount Nijō, Nara Prefecture, according to Japanese government official confirmed report, kills nine persons and injures 59 persons. 
February 26–29 – February 26 Incident (二・二六事件, Niniroku Jiken): The Imperial Way Faction engineers a failed coup against the Japanese government; some politicians are killed.
February 27 – Tokyo is placed under martial law (not to be repealed until July 16)
February 29
Prime Minister Keisuke Okada, a target in the February 26 incident, emerges from hiding.
Emperor Hirohito orders the Japanese army to arrest 123 conspirators in Tokyo government offices; 19 of them are executed in July.
Facing overwhelming opposition as the army moved against them, the rebels surrender
March 4 – The Emperor signs an ordinance on March 4 establishing a Special Court Martial (特設軍法会議 ) to try those involved in the February 26 uprising.
March 9 – Pro-democratic militarist Keisuke Okada steps down as Prime Minister of Japan and is replaced by radical militarist Kōki Hirota.
March 12 – Ukichiro Nakaya creates the first artificial snow crystal.
May 11 – According to Japanese government and former Japan Health and Welfare Ministry official report, a massive food poisoning hit, many attend and their families presented Daifuku rice cake eat, after 2,200 persons affective salmonella infection in junhor high-school sports festival in Hamamatsu, Shizuoka Prefecture, total 29 students and 15 parents and families were lost to lives.
May 18 – Sada Abe strangled her lover with an obi and then cut off his genitals to carry around with her as a souvenir. When the crime was discovered the next day it became a national sensation and would be the subject of many books and movies over the decades to follow.
July 31 – The International Olympic Committee announces that the 1940 Summer Olympics will be held in Tokyo. However, the games are given back to the IOC after the Second Sino-Japanese War breaks out, and are eventually cancelled altogether because of World War II.
August 1–August 16 – Japan competes at the 1936 Summer Olympics in Berlin, Germany. Japan wins six gold medals, four silvers, and eight Bronze.
November 20 – Mitsubishi Osarizawa mine and Nakazawa dam collapse by heavy rain, total 362 persons fatalities in Akita Prefecture, according to Japanese government official confirmed report.
Unknown date – Bousei-gakujuku, as predecessor of Tokai University was founded in Musashino, Tokyo.

Films
The Only Son (1936 film)

Births
January 24 – Etsuko Ichihara,  (d. 2019)
February 20 – Shigeo Nagashima, Japanese professional baseball player, coach
April 10 – Makoto Wada, illustrator, essayist and film director
April 22 – Takeshi Koba, professional baseball player and coach 
June 19 – Takeshi Aono, voice actor (d. 2012)
June 27 – Tadanori Yokoo, graphic designer, illustrator, print maker and painter.
July 8 – Kazuhiro Tanaka, modern pentathlete
July 16
Yasuo Fukuda, 58th Prime Minister of Japan
Akira Kinoshita, photographer
July 23 – Keiichi Tanaami, pop artist (d. 2015)
September 3 – Ikki Kajiwara, author, manga writer, and film producer (d. 1987)
October 12 – Minoru Murayama, Japanese baseball pitcher (d. 1998)
October 14 – Fuyumi Shiraishi, voice actress (d. 2019)
October 16 – Akira Machida,  Chief Justice of the Supreme Court of Japan (d. 2015)
October 25 – Masako Nozawa, voice actress
October 29 – Akiko Kojima, model and beauty queen
October 31 – Shigeo Takii, supreme court justice (d. 2015)
December 4 – Michiko Yamamoto, writer and poet

Deaths
January 11 – Ikuta Chōkō, translator, author and literary critic (b. 1882)
February 1 – Genji Matsuda, politician and cabinet minister (b. 1876)
February 26
Saitō Makoto, naval officer and politician (19th Prime Minister of Japan) (b. 1858)
 Takahashi Korekiyo, politician and Governor of the Bank of Japan (b. 1854)
 Jōtarō Watanabe, general (b. 1874)
February 29 – Shirō Nonaka, Imperial Japanese Army officer (b. 1903)
March 11 – Yumeno Kyūsaku, writer (b. 1889)
March 12 – Uchida Kōsai,  statesman, diplomat and interim prime minister (b. 1865)
March 27 – Kawasaki Takukichi, politician and cabinet minister (b. 1871)
April 8 – Chūhachi Ninomiya, aviation pioneer (b. 1866)
May 3 – Kikunae Ikeda, chemist  (b. 1864
May 27 – Take Hagiwara, military nurse (b. 1873)
June 10 – Tsuchida Bakusen, nihonga painter (b. 1887)
June 27 – Miekichi Suzuki, novelist (b. 1882)
July 3 – Saburo Aizawa (b. 1889)
July 12 – Yasuhide Kurihara (b. 1908)
October 8 – Utako Shimoda, educator and poet (b. 1854)

See also
 List of Japanese films of the 1930s

References

External links

 
1930s in Japan
Japan